Sharlyn Sarac was born in Perth, Western Australia and entered the media at age 17. Sarac presented the weekend edition of Nine News Perth from 2004 through to 2010.

After working as a surf reporter with Ten News in Perth, she attended the WA Academy of Performing Arts Broadcasting course from 1998–2000 and later worked as a reporter at GWN, a Western Australia regional station.

Later moving back to Ten News, she became a general reporter for the 5pm news in Perth.

In 2004, Sarac joined Nine News in Perth where she presents the weekend news and reports on 3 days a week. She has also covered Sonia Vinci's maternity leave. She is also a reporter on Nine's local summer lifestyle program Just Add Water. She has filed numerous stories including interviews with world champion sailors Elise Rechichi and Tessa Parkinson, Olympic rower Ben Curaton as well as taking to the surf herself with H2O Surf Adventures at Scarborough Beach.

In 2010, Sarac resigned from co-presenting weekend news with Matt Tinney.

References

External links
NineMSN profile

Nine News presenters
Living people
1980 births